Meltzer is a surname of German or Yiddish origin, meaning "malt or beer maker". 

Notable people with the surname include:

Albert Meltzer (1920–1996), British anarcho-communist activist and writer
Allan Meltzer (1928–2017), American economist
Anne Meltzer, American seismologist
Bernard Meltzer (1916–1998) American radio host
Brad Meltzer (born 1970), American author
Daniel Meltzer (1951–2015), Professor of Law at Harvard
Dave Meltzer (born 1961), American sports journalist
David Meltzer (1937-2016), American poet and musician
Donald Meltzer (1922–2004), American/British psychoanalyst
Eli Meltzer (born 1979), American musician and entertainer
Ewald Meltzer (1869–1940), German asylum director
Françoise Meltzer (born 1947), American professor of religion
Fredrik Meltzer (1779–1855), Norwegian businessman and politician
Harold Meltzer (born 1966), American composer
Isser Zalman Meltzer (1870–1953), Lithuanian Orthodox rabbi
Jamie Meltzer, American film director
Marlyn Meltzer (1922–2008), one of the original programmers for the ENIAC computer
Milton Meltzer (born 1915), American historian
Richard Meltzer (born 1945), American musician and rock music critic
Rose Meltzer, American bridge player
Roza Pomerantz-Meltzer (died 1934), first woman elected to the Parliament of Poland
Samuel James Meltzer (1851–1920), Russian/American physiologist
Toby Meltzer (born 1957), American plastic and reconstructive surgeon

See also
Meltzer, Indiana
Meltzer Woods, Indiana
Meltzer's triad
Melzer (disambiguation)
Melzer

References

Jewish surnames
Yiddish-language surnames